Salih Kuru (c. 1906 – 08.03.2012 in Kastamonu) was one of the last surviving veterans of the Turkish War of Independence.

Death 
Salih Kuru died in Anatolian Hospital on January 6, 2012, after spending three days in intensive care.

References 

1900s births
2012 deaths
Turkish centenarians
Men centenarians
Turkish military personnel of the Turkish War of Independence